Thea Krokan Murud (born 6 June 1994) is a Norwegian cross-country skier.

She participated at the 2011 European Youth Olympic Festival, winning one silver medal in the 7.5 kilometres; then at the 2012 Nordic Junior World Ski Championships, the 2016 Nordic Junior World Ski Championships (U23) and finally at the 2017 Nordic Junior World Ski Championships (U23), where she took the silver medal in the sprint.

She made her World Cup debut in March 2015 in Drammen, finishing in 49th place in the sprint prologue. She collected her first World Cup points in the March 2017 Drammen sprint, and reached the top 10 for the first time on home ground in December 2017 in Lillehammer (10 kilometres).

She represents the sports club Søre Ål IL. As an athlete she raced for Lillehammer IF in her teenage years. As an athlete she finished 14th at the 2011 World Youth Championships and 9th at the 2011 European Junior Championships, both in the 3000 metres. Her personal best times were 4:30.31 minutes in the 1500 metres and 9:45.90 minutes in the 3000 metres, both achieved in 2011.

Cross-country skiing results
All results are sourced from the International Ski Federation (FIS).

World Cup

Season standings

References 

1994 births
Living people
Sportspeople from Lillehammer
Norwegian female cross-country skiers
Norwegian female long-distance runners